The 2016 Pakistan Super League (or for sponsorship reasons HBL PSL 2016) was the debut season of the Pakistan Super League which was established by the Pakistan Cricket Board. The tournament featured five teams and was held from 4 February 2016 to 23 February 2016 in the United Arab Emirates. The opening ceremony and first match of the tournament were held at the Dubai International Cricket Stadium on 4 February 2016.

The final was held in Dubai on 23 February and saw Islamabad United defeating Quetta Gladiators by 6 wickets to win the first title. Dwayne Smith of Islamabad United was awarded the man of the match award for his innings of 73 runs from 51 balls. Ravi Bopara of the Karachi Kings was named player of the tournament.

Around half of the TV viewing audience in Pakistan watched matches in the competition at peak times.

Opening ceremony 
The opening ceremony of the tournament was held at the Dubai International Cricket Stadium in Dubai on 4 February 2016, and was hosted by Yasir Hussain and Sri Lankan model Stephanie Siriwardhana. It featured live performances by singer Ali Zafar, Jamaican rapper and singer Sean Paul, Mohib Mirza, Sanam Saeed and such other artists and ended with a firework display. A large crowd attended the ceremony at the stadium.

Player acquisition and salaries 

The player draft for the 2016 season was held at Gaddafi Stadium in Lahore on 21–22 December 2015. 308 players, including both Pakistani and international players, were divided into five different categories. Each franchise was allowed to pick a maximum of six foreign players in their squads which could have a maximum of 20 members.

Squads

Officials 
Seven umpires and two match referees made up the match officials panel for the tournament. Pakistan's top ICC umpire Aleem Dar stood in matches during the tournament as did West Indian ICC umpire Joel Wilson. Also a part of the panel were other Pakistani umpires Ahsan Raza, Shozab Raza, Ahmed Shahab, Rashid Riaz and Khalid Mahmood. The match referees panel consisted of former Sri Lankan ICC match referee Roshan Mahanama and Pakistani match referee Mohammad Anees.

Promotion and media coverage

The official anthem of PSL season I, "Ab Khel Ke Dikha" was released on 30 September 2015. It was written, composed and sung by Ali Zafar.

Venues
The venue for the tournament was originally planned to be a single stadium in Doha, Qatar. In September 2015 the Pakistan Cricket Board announced the shifting of the tournament to Dubai and Sharjah in the United Arab Emirates.

Format

Each team played each other twice in the league stage of the tournament in a round robin format. As matches were played in the UAE, all games were effectively at a neutral venue. Following the group stage the top four teams qualified for the playoff stage of the tournament.

The 2016 season of the PSL followed rules and regulations laid down by the International Cricket Council. In the group stage, two points were awarded for a win, one for a no result and none for a loss. In the event of tied scores after both teams faced their quota of overs, a super over would have been used to determine the match winner. In the group stage teams were ranked on the following criteria:

 Higher number of points
 If equal, higher number of wins
 If equal, fewest defeats
 If still equal, the results of head to head meetings
 If still equal, net run rate

If any play-off match had finished with a no result, a super over would have been used to determine the winner. If the super over had not have been possible or the result of the over was a tie, the team which finished in the highest league position at the end of the regular season would have been deemed the winner of the match.

League stage

Points table
 Top 4 teams qualified for the Playoffs
  Advanced to Qualifier
  Advanced to Eliminator 1

Notes:
 C = Champions; 
 R = Runner-up;
 (x) = Position at the end of the tournament;

Summary

League progression

Fixtures
All times are in Pakistan Standard Time (UTC+5).

Match 1
                                                                                                Match 2

                                                                                                Match 3

                                                                                                Match 4

                                                                                                Match 5

                                                                                                Match 6

                                                                                                Match 7

                                                                                                Match 8

                                                                                                 Match 9

                                                                                                 Match 10

                                                                                                 Match 11

                                                                                                 Match 12

                                                                                                 Match 13

                                                                                                 Match 14

                                                                                                 Match 15

                                                                                                 Match 16

                                                                                                 Match 17

                                                                                                 Match 18

                                                                                                 Match 19

                                                                                                 Match 20

Playoff stage
All times are in Pakistan Standard Time (UTC+5).

Qualifier

Eliminator 1

 As a result of this match Karachi Kings were eliminated.

Eliminator 2

Final

Awards and statistics
The player of the tournament was Ravi Bopara of the Karachi Kings. Bopara scored 329 runs and took 11 wickets in the tournament. Andre Russell of Islamabad United took 16 wickets at an average of 17.25 to be the leading wicket-taker ahead of Wahab Riaz of Peshawar Zalmi with 15. Umar Akmal of Lahore Qalandars was the leading run scorer with 335 runs at an average of 83.75 and also took the most catches in the tournament with 7. Winners of the Spirit of Cricket award was Lahore Qalandars.

Most runs

Most wickets

See also
Islamabad United in 2016
Quetta Gladiators in 2016
Peshawar Zalmi in 2016
Karachi Kings in 2016
Lahore Qalandars in 2016

References

External links 
 
 Tournament Site – ESPNcricinfo

 
2016 in Pakistani cricket
Pakistan Super League